The Judiciary of Morocco is an independent branch of the Moroccan government, subject only to the Moroccan Constitution.

Structure

The Moroccan court structure consists of:

 Communal and District Courts
 Administrative Tribunals
 First Instance Courts
 Courts of Appeal
 Supreme Court
 Special Court of Justice
 High Court
 Trade Courts
 The Standing Tribunal of the Royal Armed Forces

Agreements with other judiciaries 
In June 2006, Morocco and Argentina signed a bilateral agreement on judicial cooperation.

See also 
 Moroccan Dahir

References

External links
Ministry of Communications

 
Government of Morocco
Law of Morocco